Rowland Wilfred William Carter (1875–1916) was an architect, surveyor, insurance agent and auctioneer. He designed and built Arts and Crafts style buildings in Cromer and wider North Norfolk area. His studio was located at Priory House, Church Street.

Works
Commercial
1898 Double faced shop premises at 7 Bond Street.
Public

Private
 1901 Wood Dene in Cliff Avenue
 1899  9 Bernard Road. Half timbered Villa
 1901 Beach Road

References

1875 births
1916 deaths
Architects from Norfolk
19th-century English architects
20th-century English architects